Veaceslav Negruța (born 4 March 1972) is a Moldovan economist. He was the Minister of Finance (2009-2013) in the First Vlad Filat Cabinet and in the Second Filat Cabinet, and in the Leancă Cabinet as well.

Biography 

Veaceslav Negruța was born on 4 March 1972, in Delacău, in the Grigoriopol District of the Moldovan SSR. He was a member of the Liberal Democratic Party of Moldova.

References

 

1972 births
Liberal Democratic Party of Moldova politicians
Living people
Moldovan economists
People from Grigoriopol District
Moldovan Ministers of Finance